Star Channel (formerly SuomiTV and later Fox) is a Finnish entertainment TV channel owned and operated by The Walt Disney Company through its local subsidiary The Walt Disney Company Nordic AB, filial i Finland (formerly Family Channel Oy, Fox International Channels Oy and Fox Networks Group Oy). The channel was acquired by FNG Nordic (then known as FIC Nordic) in January 2012, and then relaunched as its current incarnation on 16 April that year.

Star Channel is freely available in Finland both over-the-air and through cable, as it bases its funding on television advertisements. It is FNG Nordic's first channel that does not operate on subscriber fees.

As the channel was licensed as generalist channel, it was required to broadcast certain television programmes. As of 2018, Fox fulfilled such requirements by simulcasting Sky News (which was a fellow 21st Century Fox business until November 2018) overnight, and showing programmes aimed at children in mornings under Fox Kids programming block. Such requirements were later lifted.

Fox Networks Group Oy also operates the Finnish version of National Geographic television channel.

The channel provided a free catch up service through its online platform FOXplay until 2019.

Effective 1 January 2019, Sanoma Media Finland took over media sales representation of Fox Networks Group channels in Finland, which includes this channel.

On October 26, 2022, The Walt Disney Company Nordic & Baltic announced that Fox would be renamed as Star Channel on 6 January 2023.

Past programming

News 
SuomiTV had its own news department, but it was later phased out.

Until 2019, Fox simulcast Sky News during overnight hours.

Fox Kids 
This is the only outlet to revive the Fox Kids name, which was phased out most of the world. Initially, it utilised the Fox Kids' global logo and on-screen branding from early 2000s, but it was later replaced by another logo and look. After Disney's acquisition of 21st Century Fox, Fox Kids is managed by Disney Channels Worldwide.

The block offered foreign television programs aimed at a young audience dubbed into the Finnish language. The block aired for the last time on 6 January 2019.

References

External links
  
 http://www.foxplay.fi (Archived)

Finland
Television channels in Finland
Television channels and stations established in 2012